James Bernard Keeffe (20 August 1919 – 15 May 1988) was an Australian politician who served in the Australian Senate as a Labor Senator for Queensland.

Early life
Born in Atherton, Queensland, he was educated at state schools before becoming a farm labourer and forestry worker. After serving in the military 1942–1945, he became an insurance and real-estate salesman.

He became state secretary of the Coopers' Union, before serving as secretary of the Queensland Labor Party between 1960 and 1965, and as federal president from 1962 to 1970.

Senator
In 1964, he was elected to the Australian Senate as a Labor Senator for Queensland, taking his seat in 1965. He remained a Senator until his retirement in 1983.

In 1978, Keeffe ran a petition supporting the wishes of the Aboriginal people on Palm Island to retain their Aboriginal council. However the council was sacked by Joh Bjelke-Petersen's government in July 1978. This followed moves by the Queensland Government to hand over control of Palm Island to Townsville Council. The government ran a counter-petition, which, it was reported, carried forgeries and duplication of names; both petitions contained many of the same people's signatures.

Later life and death
In May 1988, Keeffe visited Canberra for the opening of the New Parliament House. On 15 May, he was found dead by his son when his returning train pulled into the station in Townsville.

References

1919 births
1988 deaths
Australian Labor Party members of the Parliament of Australia
Members of the Australian Senate for Queensland
Members of the Australian Senate
Australian people of Irish descent
20th-century Australian politicians